Vladyslav Zahrebelnyi (born 28 November 1991) is a Ukrainian para-athlete who specializes in long jump. He represents Ukraine at elite international competitions.

Career
Zahrebelnyi represented Ukraine in the men's long jump T37 event at the 2016 Summer Paralympics and finished in fourth place with a personal best jump 5.95 metres. 

Zahrebelnyi again represented Ukraine in the men's long jump T37 event at the 2020 Summer Paralympics and won a gold medal.

References

1991 births
Living people
Paralympic athletes of Ukraine
Ukrainian male long jumpers
Medalists at the World Para Athletics European Championships
Medalists at the World Para Athletics Championships
Athletes (track and field) at the 2020 Summer Paralympics
Medalists at the 2020 Summer Paralympics
Paralympic gold medalists for Ukraine
Paralympic medalists in athletics (track and field)
Sportspeople from Dnipro
Ukrainian male sprinters